"Breathe Life into Me" is a song by British singer Mica Paris. It was released as the third single from her debut album So Good by 4th & B'way Records and became her third consecutive top-thirty hit in the UK. The song was originally sung by American CCM singer Russ Taff from his 1987 self-titled album.

Reception

Debuting at number sixty-nine on the UK Singles Chart, "Breathe Life into Me" rose steadily, reaching the top forty in its fourth week and peaking at number twenty-six in its seventh week. "Breathe Life into Me" accumulated a total of 11 weeks on the chart. In the US, the song was Paris' second appearance on the US R&B/Hip-Hop Songs chart, where it peaked at number twenty-four.

Track listing
12" vinyl
Side one
 Breathe Life into Me (Extended Remix) 
Side two
 Breathe Life into Me (Radio Mix) 
 In the City

CD single
 Breathe Life into Me (Radio Remix) 
 Breathe Life into Me (Extended Remix) 
 In The City 
 Like Dreamers Do (Hello New York)

Charts

References

Mica Paris songs
1988 singles
4th & B'way Records singles
1988 songs
Songs written by Peter Vale
Songs written by Mick Leeson